Sung Min may refer to:

 Seong-min, Korean given name
 Sung Min (swimmer)